This is a list of museums in Afghanistan by city.

Ghazni
  Museum of Islamic Art

Hadda
  Nangarhar Provincial Museum

Herat
  Herat National Museum
   Jihad Museum

Kabul
  National Museum of Afghanistan
  OMAR Mine Museum

Kandahar
  Kandahar Provincial Museum

Mazari Sharif
  Balkh Provincial Museum

See also 
 List of libraries in Afghanistan

External links 
 National Museum of Afghanistan

Museums
 
Afghanistan
Museums
Museums
Afghanistan